Sigurd Valdemar von Numers (20 March 1903 – 1983)  was a Finnish diplomat, a Doctor of Law from 1928. He was awarded the title of the Consul General in 1944.

von Numers was born in Viipuri. He served as Chargé d'Affaires  in Ottawa, Canada, from 1954 to 1959, to India in New Delhi from 1959 to 1960, Ambassador to the United States from 1960 to 1961 and in the Netherlands as ambassador 1964–1970. Before and after international commissions he was head of the Legal Department of the Ministry for Foreign Affairs from 1949 to 1954 and again from 1961.

During the 1930s, in Stockholm, as a secretary of state, von Numers interfered with the so-called Maydell affair, for example, by granting Nansen passport to Russian citizen residing in Germany,  Baron Karl Frederick Karl Viktor von Maydell-Felks (born 1899)  who was dubious to make a film in Finland.

References 

20th-century Finnish lawyers
Ambassadors of Finland to the Netherlands
Ambassadors of Finland to the United States
Ambassadors of Finland to India
Ambassadors of Finland to Thailand
Ambassadors of Finland to Indonesia
Ambassadors of Finland to Ireland
1903 births
1983 deaths
Diplomats from Vyborg